Oğuzköy can refer to:

 Oğuzköy, Acıpayam
 Oğuzköy, Kemah